Epameinondas Kavvadias (1886–10 April 1965) was a Greek admiral who served thrice as Chief of the Navy General Staff and led the Greek fleet in the first years of World War II.

Life 
Epameinondas Kavvadias was born in Athens in 1886 to a family hailing from Kefalonia. His father, Panagiotis Kavvadias, was an archaeologist who became Greece's Ephor General of Antiquities. Kavvadias entered the Hellenic Naval Academy in 1902 and graduated in 1906, and served in the Royal Hellenic Navy in the Balkan Wars as a sub-lieutenant in the destroyer Nafkratousa. He was dismissed from the Navy in 1922, following the September 1922 Revolution, due to his royalist convictions, but reinstated by the Theodoros Pangalos dictatorship in 1925.

As Captain, he served his first tenure as Chief of the Navy General Staff in 1933–1934. In 1935 he was appointed to the post of Commander of the submarine fleet, and served again for a short period at the head of the Navy General Staff in December 1936 – January 1937. He subsequently served as Chief of the Royal Naval Base at Salamis until 1939, including another short term at the head of the General Staff in August–September 1938. Promoted to Rear Admiral in the meantime, in September 1939 he was appointed Chief of the Fleet Command. He led the operations of the Greek fleet during the Greco-Italian War of 1940–1941, and following the German invasion of Greece in April 1941, led the fleet to its exile in the British-held Middle East. He remained Chief of the Fleet until 2 May 1942, when he was appointed Vice Minister for Naval Affairs in the Greek government in exile, a post he held until 25 March 1943. In 1946, he was sent to London as naval attaché. In 1950, he published his war memoirs under the title The naval war of 1940 as I experienced it.

He died in Athens on 10 April 1965.

Honours 
Among other Greek and foreign medals, Kavvadias received:
 Commander's Cross of the Cross of Valour (1 July 1947), Greece's highest military award, for his overall leadership of the fleet in World War II
 Medal for Outstanding Acts (31 August 1946), for his role in the reorganization of the fleet in exile
 War Cross 1st Class (31 August 1946), for the Greco-Italian War
 War Cross 2nd Class (14 September 1944), for the Navy's evacuation in April 1941
 War Cross 2nd Class (27 October 1941), for the Greco-Italian War
 Cross of Valour in Gold (25 February 1922), for the Asia Minor Campaign

He was also named honorary aide de camp to King Paul in 1947, and Honorary Chief of the Fleet in 1963.

References

Sources
 
 

1886 births
1965 deaths
Royal Hellenic Navy admirals of World War II
Ministers of Naval Affairs of Greece
Commander's Crosses of the Cross of Valour (Greece)
Recipients of the War Cross (Greece)
Chiefs of the Hellenic Navy General Staff
Military personnel from Athens
Greek naval attachés